Caoimhe, pronounced Kweeva, sometimes anglicised as Kiva and pronounced as Keeva in Ulster, is an Irish feminine given name derived from Irish  (Old Irish ) "dear; noble". It means 'beautiful'. It has been well-used in English-speaking countries and particularly in Ireland. 
from the same root as the masculine name  Caoimhín (Kevin).

, it was ranked 19th most popular name among female births in Ireland.

Notable people named Caoimhe
Caoimhe Archibald, Irish MLA
Caoimhe Butterly (born 1978), Irish human rights activist
Caoimhe Guilfoyle, contestant in the 11th series of Big Brother UK, 2010
Keeva Fennelly (born 1987), Irish camogie player and financial reporter
Kiva Reardon (born 1987), Irish-Canadian film critic, Founder of Cléo Journal, International Film Festival Programmer.

See also
List of Irish-language given names

References

Irish feminine given names
Irish-language feminine given names